I'm Alright Now is a 1967 Australian TV variety show starring Reg Livermore and Ruth Cracknell.

References

External links

1967 films
Australian Broadcasting Corporation original programming